The East Africa Exchange (EAX), also, East African Commodity Exchange, is a privately funded regional, agricultural commodities exchange in East Africa. It was launched in Kigali, Rwanda, in July 2014. EAX is the third-largest agricultural commodities exchange in Africa, behind the  South African Futures Exchange and the Ethiopia Commodity Exchange.

Location
The headquarters of EAX are located on the 12th Floor, at Kigali City Tower, 
Avenue du Commerce, in the city of Kigali, the capital of Rwanda. The coordinates of the headquarters of EAX are:1°56'37.0"S, 30°03'34.0"E (Latitude:-1.943601; Longitude:30.059431).

Overview
The primary objective of the exchange is to facilitate farmers and producers of agricultural produce with obtaining fair prices for their goods and merchandise and in accessing reasonable funding for their businesses. Starting with maize and beans, the exchange plans to expand into coffee, tea, and rice. As of March 2016, EAX is operational in Rwanda and Kenya with plans to enter Uganda in 2016.

Shareholding
The table below illustrates the shareholding in EAX:

See also
Rwanda Stock Exchange
Partnership for Enhancing Agriculture in Rwanda through Linkages

References

External links
 Webpage of East Africa Exchange
  East Africa Exchange to Lend Grain Farmers U.S.$70 Million

Economy of Rwanda
Agriculture companies of Rwanda
Financial services companies established in 2014
2014 establishments in Rwanda
Organisations based in Kigali